Rui Machado was the defending champion but decided not to participate that year.
Jerzy Janowicz won the final 6–3, 6–3 against Jonathan Dasnières de Veigy.

Seeds

Draw

Finals

Top half

Bottom half

External Links
 Main Draw
 Qualifying Draw

Poznan Open - Singles
2012 Singles